In June 2018, England played a three-test series against  as part of the 2018 mid-year rugby union tests. The series was part of the sixth year of the global rugby calendar established by World Rugby, which runs through to 2019.

Fixtures

Squads
Note: Ages, caps and clubs are as per 9 June, the first test match of the tour.

England
On 29 May, England finalised a 34-man tour squad for their 3-test series summer tour of South Africa.

On 11 June, Jack Singleton joined the squad as a third choice hooker option and injury cover for Luke Cowan-Dickie.

Coaching team:
 Head coach:  Eddie Jones
 Attack coach:  Scott Wisemantel
 Defence coach:  Paul Gustard
 Forwards coach:  Steve Borthwick
 Scrum coach:  Neal Hatley

South Africa
On 26 May 2018, head coach Rassie Erasmus named a 43-man squad for South Africa's June Internationals.

Coaching team:
 Head coach:  Rassie Erasmus
 Attack coach:  Mzwandile Stick
 Defence coach:  Jacques Nienaber
 Scrum coach:  Pieter de Villiers

Matches

English warm-up match (Barbarians)

Notes:
 This is the first time since 2014 the Barbarians has defeated England.

South African warm-up match (Wales)

Notes:
 Tomos Williams (Wales) and Robert du Preez, Thomas du Toit, André Esterhuizen, Travis Ismaiel, Jason Jenkins, Makazole Mapimpi, Ox Nché, Sikhumbuzo Notshe, Marvin Orie, Embrose Papier, Kwagga Smith, Akker van der Merwe and Ivan van Zyl (all South Africa) made their international debuts.
 This victory saw Wales record a record third consecutive win against the Springboks, and win for the first time away from home.

First test

Notes:
 Aphiwe Dyantyi, S'busiso Nkosi and RG Snyman (all South Africa) and Brad Shields and Ben Spencer (both England) made their international debuts.
 Mako Vunipola (England) earned his 50th test cap.

Second test

Notes:
 Tendai Mtawarira (South Africa) earned his 100th test cap.

Third test

Notes:
 This was England's first victory over South Africa in South Africa since they won 27–22 in 2000.

See also
 2018 mid-year rugby union internationals
 History of rugby union matches between England and South Africa

References

External links
 Official Website of South African Rugby
 Official Website of English Rugby

2018
2017–18 in English rugby union
2018 rugby union tours
2018 in South African rugby union